A toboggan is a simple sled traditionally used by children. It is also a traditional form of transport used by the Innu and Cree of northern Canada.

In modern times, it is used on snow to carry one or more people (often children) down a hill or other slope for recreation. Designs vary from simple, traditional models to modern engineered composites. A toboggan differs from most sleds or sleighs in that it has no runners or skis (or only low ones) on the underside. The bottom of a toboggan rides directly on the snow. Some parks include designated toboggan hills where ordinary sleds are not allowed and which may include toboggan runs similar to bobsleigh courses.

Toboggans can vary depending on the climate and geographical region.

Design and use 

Before white colonists arrived in America, toboggan was an Algonquian term for a type of man-hauled cargo sledge made from bark, hardwood or whalebone, and deer or buffalo hide. Sledges of this type have been in use on the Great Plains and the Great Lakes since 3000 BCE. During the tribes' yearly migration to their winter campsites, these sledges were used to transport bulky personal possessions and small children before the introduction of the wheel. A smaller variant of the toboggan, used for recreational purposes, was known as a Tom Pung. As the settlers displaced the Indians, the term was appropriated and applied to the low-profile wooden sledges made by the colonists.

The precursor to the modern American toboggan was the small, utilitarian sledge used by woodcutters in Russia, Scandinavia, and especially Germany, to transport logs when the snow made roads inaccessible. Sledge races were a popular winter sport in mountainous countries during the pre-Industrial Revolution era, and early German colonists in America improved upon the design of the traditional toboggan by giving it a lower, more streamlined profile to increase its speed.

The traditional American toboggan is made of bound, parallel wood slats, all bent up and backwards at the front to form a recumbent 'J' shape. A thin rope is run across the edge of end of the curved front to provide rudimentary steering. These usually lack the iron runners of the older woodcutter's sledges. The frontmost rider places their feet in the curved front space and sits on the flat bed; any others sit behind them and grasp the waist of the person before them.

Toboggans come in a variety of shapes. Modern recreational toboggans are typically manufactured from wood or plastic or aluminum.  A small plastic sled on which a rider sits and raises their legs while sledding may be known as a bum slider. Larger, more rugged models are made for commercial or rescue use.

See also 

 Bobsled
 Luge
 Pulk
 Skeleton (sport)
 Sled 
 Toboggan (hat)

References

External links 

 

Sports equipment
Sledding
Sliding vehicles
Human-powered vehicles
Snow sports
Outdoor recreation
Canadian culture
Individual sports
pt:Tobogã